Dirk Meier (born 28 January 1964) is a retired East German cyclist. He had his best achievements in the 4000 m team pursuit, winning silver medals at the world championships of 1986 and 1987 and at the 1988 Summer Olympics. 

As a road racer, he won the Tour de Liège in 1987 and 1989, as well as the Niedersachsen Rundfahrt and Olympia's Tour in 1988.

References

1964 births
Living people
People from Spremberg
People from Bezirk Cottbus
East German male cyclists
Cyclists from Brandenburg
Olympic cyclists of East Germany
Cyclists at the 1988 Summer Olympics
Olympic silver medalists for East Germany
Olympic medalists in cycling
Medalists at the 1988 Summer Olympics
Recipients of the Patriotic Order of Merit in silver